This article lists Canadian supercentenarians (people from Canada who have attained the age of at least 110 years). The oldest verified Canadian person ever was Marie-Louise Meilleur, who died in 1998 aged 117 years, 230 days.

100 oldest known Canadians

Biographies

Sum Ying Fung 
Sum Ying Fung (née Eng, 27 January 1899 – 6 December 2011), was a Chinese Canadian supercentenarian who was the oldest person in Canada in 2011.

Sum Ying Eng was born in Wing On Village, Yanping, China in 1899. In 1926, she married Chong Lim Fung, who had been working in Canada since 1911. Chong Lim would travel to visit Sum Ying regularly in the ensuing years and they had three children. However, the Chinese Exclusion Act prevented her from joining her husband in Canada. In 1954, she emigrated to Canada under the sponsorship of her husband. The couple settled in Chinatown, Vancouver that year. The Fung family moved to East Vancouver upon Chong Lim's death in 1967.

In 1989, she developed a brain tumour, underwent surgery, and survived. She visited China later that year and was in Beijing during the military crackdown of Tiananmen Square protests. She and her family fled Beijing among a group of German tourists.

In January 2011, Sum Ying Fung became the oldest person in Canada, after the death of Elizabeth Buhler. The Queen congratulated Fung in a letter on her 112th birthday on 27 January 2011 and the Mayor of Vancouver declared that day "Fung Eng Sum Ying Day".

Fung died of natural causes at the claimed age of 112, at Burnaby General Hospital in British Columbia on 6 December 2011. At the time of her death she was survived by two of her three children, 14 grandchildren, 25 great-grand children, and 2 great-great-grand children.

References 

 
Canadian
Supercentenarians